The 2000 House elections in Georgia occurred on November 7, 2000 to elect the members of the State of Georgia's delegation to the United States House of Representatives. Georgia had eleven seats in the House, apportioned according to the 1990 United States Census.

These elections were held concurrently with the United States presidential election of 2000, United States Senate elections of 2000 (including special Senate election in Georgia), the United States House elections in other states, and various state and local elections.

The only competitive race to occur that year was in Georgia's 2nd congressional district in which incumbent Representative Sanford Bishop overcame a strong challenge from Dylan Glenn.

Overview

Results

References

2000 Georgia (U.S. state) elections
Georgia
2000